Peristeria cerina is a species of orchid occurring from Trinidad to northeastern Brazil.

References

External links 

cerina
Orchids of Brazil
Orchids of Trinidad